Baswa railway station is a railway station in Dausa district, Rajasthan. Its code is BU. It serves Baswa. The station consists of 2 platforms. Passenger, Express trains halt here.

References

Railway stations in Dausa district
Jaipur railway division